Ulopeza nigricostata is a moth in the family Crambidae. It was described by George Hampson in 1912. It is found in Nigeria.

The wingspan is about 22 mm. The forewings are orange-yellow, the costa fuscous brown with a cupreous gloss except towards the base, the terminal area broadly fuscous brown with a cupreous gloss. The hindwings are yellow, the terminal area fuscous brown with a cupreous gloss.

References

Endemic fauna of Nigeria
Moths described in 1912
Spilomelinae